Sergei Aleksandrovich Teploukhov (March 3, 1888 – March 10, 1934) was an archaeologist from the Soviet Union. From 1920 to 1932, Teploukhov conducted research on the archaeological remains of various periods in Siberia and Central Asia. He was the first to devise a classification of the archaeological cultures of Southern Siberia. Teploukhov was arrested on suspicions of nationalism on November 26, 1933 and was found dead in his cell on March 10, 1934.

External links
Great Soviet Encyclopedia

1888 births
1934 deaths
People from Perm Krai
People from Permsky Uyezd
Soviet archaeologists